Waupaca Foundry, Inc., formerly known as ThyssenKrupp Waupaca, is among the world's largest independent iron foundries. The company produces gray, ductile, and compacted graphite iron castings. Global markets served include automotive and light truck, commercial vehicle, agriculture, construction, material handling, and other industrial sectors. With headquarters and three plants in Waupaca, Wisconsin as well as plants in Marinette, Wisconsin, Tell City, Indiana, Effingham, Illinois, and Ironwood, Michigan, the foundry employs about 4,500 people.  

Previously owned by ThyssenKrupp, ThyssenKrupp Waupaca was purchased by New York-based private equity firm KPS Capital Partners. The company has been officially renamed Waupaca Foundry, Inc. In 2014, Waupaca Foundry was acquired by Hitachi Metals, becoming part of Hitachi Metals’ high-grade Functional Components Company.

References

External links 
 
 ThyssenKrupp

Thyssen AG
1955 establishments in Wisconsin
Foundries in the United States
Waupaca County, Wisconsin
Companies based in Wisconsin